The Lunning Prize was instituted by Frederik Lunning, owner of the New York agency for Georg Jensen.  The prize was awarded to eminent Scandinavian designers, two each year, from 1951 to 1970.  The recipients were selected by a group of peers from Denmark, Finland, Norway and Sweden.

The Lunning Prize and its recipients were instrumental in establishing the concept and profile of Scandinavian Design, both at home and abroad, during this vital period.

Recipients

References

Further reading
Byars,Mel: "The Design Encyclopedia",MoMA,New York, 2004.
Dahlbäck-Lutteman, Helena, ed.: "The Lunning Prize". Nationalmuseum,catalogue #489, Stockholm. 1986.  
Möller, Svend Erik: "34 Scandinavian Designers".Copenhagen.1967.

Design awards
Awards established in 1951
Awards disestablished in 1970